General Gillespie may refer to:

George Lewis Gillespie Jr. (1841–1913), Union Army major general
Ken Gillespie (born 1952), Australian Army lieutenant general
Robert Rollo Gillespie (1766–1814), British Army major general